The 1965 Federation Cup was a team tennis tournament that took place at the Kooyong Lawn Tennis Club in Melbourne, Australia. It was third edition of the of what is now known as the Fed Cup and had eleven nations participating in the tournament throughout the four days from 15–18 January 1965.

The eleven teams played in a knockout format with six teams having to play in the opening round to join the remaining five who received first rounds byes. After winning all of the ties 3-0, the final was between the United States and Australia who for the third time in consecutive years met up in the final which was played on the 18 January. After Lesley Turner and Margaret Smith each recorded wins in the singles, Australia would defend their title that they won in 1964 despite a loss in the doubles.

Participating teams

Draw
All ties were played at the Kooyong Lawn Tennis Club in Melbourne, Australia on grass courts.

First round
West Germany vs. Italy

Japan vs. France

New Zealand vs. Argentina

Quarterfinals
United States vs. Italy

Great Britain vs. South Africa

France vs. Brazil

New Zealand vs. Australia

Semifinals
United States vs. Great Britain

France vs. Australia

Final
United States vs. Australia

References

Billie Jean King Cups by year
Federation Cup
Federation Cup
Federation Cup
Federation Cup
Federation Cup
Federation Cup
Federation Cup
Tennis in Victoria (Australia)